Bufalini may refer to:

 Bufalini (surname),an Italian surname 
 Bufalini Chapel, chapel of the church of Santa Maria in Aracoeli, Rome, Italy
 Castello Bufalini, castle-residence outside of the town of San Giustino, Umbria, Italy

See also 

 Bufalino (disambiguation)
 Bufali